The Al-Yahudu tablets are a collection of about 200 clay tablets from the sixth and fifth centuries BCE on the exiled Judean community in Babylonia following the destruction of the First Temple. They contain information on the physical condition of the exiles from Judah and their financial condition in Babylon. The tablets are named after the central settlement mentioned in the documents, āl Yahudu (Akkadian "The town of Judah"), which was "presumably in the vicinity of Borsippa".

The earliest document in the collection dates back to 572 BCE, about 15 years after the destruction of the Temple, during the reign of Nebuchadnezzar II. The most recent tablet dates back to 477 BCE, during the reign of Xerxes I, about 60 years after the Return to Zion began and about 20 years before the rise of Ezra the Scribe.

Discovery and research
The public records do not contain information on the location and date of the discovery of the documents in Iraq, and it seems that they were not found in an archaeological excavation. The first time the public was exposed to the documents and the settlement of al-Yahudu was in an article by two French researchers in 1999, which dealt with three legal documents of Jews in Babylon, including the city of al-Yahudu itself. These three certificates were part of a small collection of six documents in the possession of Israeli antiquities collector Shlomo Moussaieff.

At the beginning of the 21st century, it turned out that this was not a small collection, but a collection of more than 200 documents, most of which were in two other private collections. Some of the documents were presented in 2004 at Beth Hatefutsoth in Tel Aviv and were investigated in part by Kathleen Abraham of Bar-Ilan University. Since then, the entire collection has been investigated mainly by two researchers - Cornelia Wunsch of Germany and Laurie Pearce of the United States. After a series of papers on documentary issues, Wensh and Pierce published in early 2015 the first full translations and analysis of the collection in the author's book.

Geography
The location and circumstances of the discovery of the documents have not been published. However, the location of the communities mentioned in the documents, where exiled Jews settled, can be traced based on clues found in the documents' contents. The assessment is based on two main components:

 The mention of familiar sites, such as cities that have been excavated and researched, or concepts that have been evaluated for their location.
 Cross-referencing the names of the few writers mentioned in the documents vis-à-vis the communities mentioned in them and the date of writing the documents. In some cases, this cross-cross has made it possible to estimate the distance between a recognized locality and an unrecognized locality.

Based on this, researchers estimate that al-Yahudu and the other communities mentioned in the documents are located in the area southeast of the city of Nippur.

The localities mentioned in the documents
Beyond the settlement of al-Yahudu, other settlements were mentioned where Jews were living or working. Some of them are well-known cities and some were apparently satellite settlements of al-Yahudu. The main localities mentioned in the documents are:

 Al-Yahudu: The dominant settlement in the documents. The most ancient document in the collection, dated 572 BCE, is called Al-Yahudiyya ("City of the Jews").
 Beit Nashar: Apparently not far from al-Yahudu. A mixed community, where Jews also lived. The ruler of the settlement, which appears in many of the documents, was Ahikar ben Riemot, who was probably Jewish in origin.
 House of Aviram: Possibly named after Abraham. Although this locality is located in connection with al-Yahudu, there were no Jews with Jewish names and it is unclear whether Jews lived there. The person with the most mentions in this locality is Zbava Sher-Ozer, an administrator for the heir to the Babylonian throne.
 The village of Ubu Sha Tubiyama: Possibly named after the village's founder, Tuviyahu ben Mukhaiahu.
 Al-Hazatu: A community of Philistines exiled from Gaza.

The collection also contains documents from the cities of Babylon, Nippur, Borsippa, and even a document signed on the banks of the Kebar River, known in the bible as the site of the Exile and known from the Babylonian records as an irrigation canal which was also used as a transportation channel for commerce and movement of people. The collection contained no references to other biblical-known cities in which the Babylonian exiles resided.

Life of Jews in Babylon as reflected in the documents
The al-Yahudu tablets cover a period of 100 years under Babylonian rule, especially Persian. In general, the documents show a similarity between the life of the Jews and other exiles in the kingdom at the time. In principle, it can be said that the documents attest to the tension between the preservation of Jewish identity, language, culture and religion and the need, and sometimes the will, to integrate into life in Babylon. In this respect, life in Babylon corresponds to the instruction of the prophet Jeremiah in a letter he sent from Judah to the Babylonian exiles following the exile of Jeconiah in 597 BCE.

Status of exiles
According to the documents, the Jews were defined as "Shushanu". This status is also known from other documents from the period and relates to foreign exiles who were exiled to Babylon, mainly in order to rehabilitate cities and areas devastated by past wars. These exiles received land lease for their livelihood in the form of service in exchange for land. Although they can be compared to the status of land-bound tenants, they seem to have enjoyed freedom of movement, they were defined as independent entities before the Babylonian and Persian law and enjoyed the possibilities of social and economic integration.

Service for the Kingdom
The type of service required of the exiles is mentioned in the documents, both in the context of the designation of the leasehold lands and directly in the jobs that the exiles were required to perform as part of the payment of taxes. Based on other documents dealing with payment of tax and service to the kingdom after their settlement, it seems that other exiles were employed in physical labor. These included construction work, excavation and maintenance of irrigation channels. It is possible that among these were many of the "plow and locksmith", mentioned in connection with the exile of Jeconiah in 597 BCE. The nature of the service described also appears to indicate a restriction imposed on them in their movement, and to a certain extent may have been in this period a status similar to that of a slave. This period may be reflected in the famous lines of Psalm 137 on the exile.

Social and economic integration
Most of the Jews on the certificates made their living from agriculture. Most of the land they leased grew dates and barley, but wheat, spices and linen were also mentioned in the documents. Analysis of the money amounts in the transactions appearing in the certificates shows that they had a low economic status relative to the kingdom. A comparison of the economic agreements from other collections in Babylon indicates the integration of the Jews into the economic life of Babylon, and it seems that they operated on the daily economic level, like other Babylonians, and not necessarily according to the laws of the Torah.

Among the exiles, there are documents of a number of Jews of strong economic standing. Some (such as Raphaiah Ben Smachiho and his son) acted as intermediaries and credit providers to the Jewish population and managed to accumulate substantial capital. These intermediaries provided pure silver coins to concentrate tax payments of various Jews and provided farmers with means of production, such as plowing animals and grain.

Jewish lifestyle and attitude toward Zion
Due to the nature of the documents, this subject appears only implicitly. The preservation of Jewish identity can be seen in the sequence of names given to family members for at least four generations, the fact that no documents were found on Jewish holidays, and that dates were not signed on Shabbat.

The documents do not show signs of people leaving for Judea, but at least two Jews have been found who had a desire to return to Zion:
 A man named Yashuv Tzadik, apparently given his name in the hope of returning to the Holy Land.
 A man named Yaeliahu, who points to his parents' desire that he immigrates to Israel. The name relates to the term "Va-Yael" from the Book of Ezra (1:3), which refers to the immigration of exiles back to Judah, as allowed by Cyrus in 538 BCE.

Babylonized naming conventions

The Al-Yahudu Tablets provide among the first Babylonian transcriptions of Israelite names. Earlier, the Assyrians, whom the Babylonians had usurped, had made several inscriptions which featured names of Israelite or Judahite provenance, including Omri, Hezekiah, Pekah and Hoshea, Jehoiachin, and Yahu-Bihdi.

See also
 Babylonian Exile
 Babylonian Jews

References

6th-century BC works
5th-century BC works
Akkadian inscriptions
Archaeological theft
Ancient Near and Middle East clay objects
Ancient Jewish history
History of human rights
Return to Zion
Biblical archaeology
Jewish Babylonian history